South Eastern District or South East District may refer to several places:

Country subdivisions
South-East District, Botswana
South Eastern Subregion, Eritrea
South Eastern District, Malta

Other uses
South Eastern School District, York County, Pennsylvania
South East Community Development Council, Singapore

See also 
Southeast

District name disambiguation pages